Mastacembelus micropectus is a species of fish in the family Mastacembelidae. It is endemic to Lake Tanganyika. It is threatened by habitat loss.

References

micropectus
Fish of Lake Tanganyika
Taxonomy articles created by Polbot
Fish described in 1962
Taxa named by Hubert Matthes